Death Note (stylized in all caps) is a Japanese manga series written by Tsugumi Ohba and illustrated by Takeshi Obata. It was serialized in Shueisha's shōnen manga magazine Weekly Shōnen Jump from December 2003 to May 2006, with its chapters collected in 12 tankōbon volumes. The story follows Light Yagami, a genius who discovers a mysterious notebook: the "Death Note", which belonged to the shinigami Ryuk, and grants the user the supernatural ability to kill anyone whose name is written in its pages. The series centers around Light's subsequent attempts to use the Death Note to carry out a worldwide massacre of individuals whom he deems immoral and to create a crime-free society, using the alias of a god-like vigilante named "Kira", and the subsequent efforts of an elite Japanese police task force, led by enigmatic detective L, to apprehend him.

A 37-episode anime television series adaptation, produced by Madhouse and directed by Tetsurō Araki, was broadcast on Nippon Television from October 2006 to June 2007. A light novel based on the series, written by Nisio Isin, was also released in 2006. Additionally, various video games have been published by Konami for the Nintendo DS. The series was adapted into three live-action films released in Japan in June, November 2006, and February 2008, and a television drama in 2015. A miniseries titled Death Note: New Generation and a fourth film were released in 2016. An American film adaptation was released exclusively on Netflix in August 2017, and a series is reportedly in the works.

Death Note media, except for video games and soundtracks, is licensed and released in North America by Viz Media. The episodes from the anime first appeared in North America as downloadable from IGN before Viz Media licensed it. The series was aired on YTV's Bionix programming block in Canada and on Adult Swim in the United States with a DVD release following. The live-action films briefly played in certain North American theaters, in 2008, before receiving home video releases. As of April 2015, the Death Note manga had over 30 million copies in circulation, making it one of the best-selling manga series.

Plot

In Tokyo, a disaffected high school student named Light Yagami finds the "Death Note", a mysterious black notebook that can kill anyone as long as the user knows both the target's name and face. Initially terrified of its god-like power, Light considers the possibilities of the Death Note's abilities and kills high-profile Japanese criminals, then targets international criminals. Five days after discovering the notebook, Light is visited by Ryuk, a "shinigami" and the Death Note's previous owner. Ryuk, invisible to anyone who has not touched the notebook, reveals that he dropped the notebook into the human world out of boredom and is amused by Light's actions.

As criminals around the world die from inexplicable accidents and heart attacks, the global media suggest that a single mastermind is responsible for the mysterious murders and name them . Hoping to apprehend Kira, Interpol requests the assistance of an enigmatic consulting detective, known as L, to assist their investigation. Deducing that Kira is based in Japan, L tricks Light into revealing that he is in the Kanto region of Japan by manipulating him to kill a decoy. Furious, Light vows to kill L, whom he views as obstructing his plans. L deduces that Kira has inside knowledge of the Japanese police investigation, being led by Light's father, Soichiro Yagami. Under the suspicion that "Kira" could have family ties with members of the "Kira" investigation, L assigns a team of FBI agents to monitor the families of those connected with the investigation and L learns enough to designate Light as the prime suspect. Around this time, Light graduates from high school to college. L recruits Light into the Kira Task Force, with each trying to get the other to reveal crucial information.

Actress-model Misa Amane, having obtained a second Death Note from a shinigami named Rem, makes a deal with Rem for shinigami eyes, which reveal the names of anyone whose face she sees, at the cost of half her lifespan. Seeking to have Light become her boyfriend, Misa uncovers Light's identity as the original Kira, but Light has another motive: he intends to use Misa's shinigami eyes to discern L's true name. L deduces that Misa is likely the second Kira and detains her. Rem threatens to kill Light if he does not find a way to save Misa. Light arranges a scheme in which he and Misa temporarily lose their memories of the Death Note, and has Rem pass the Death Note to a less morally driven individual, Kyosuke Higuchi of the Yotsuba Group. With memories of the Death Note erased, Light joins the investigation and, together with L, deduce Higuchi's identity and arrest him. Light regains his memories and uses the Death Note to kill Higuchi, regaining possession of the book. After restoring Misa's memories, Light instructs her to begin killing as Kira, causing L to cast suspicion on Misa. With Light insinuating the investigation would lead to Misa's capture and execution, Rem realizes Light's plan all along was to have her sacrifice herself to kill L, as a shinigami may not kill others to prevent a human's death. After Rem kills L, she disintegrates and Light obtains her Death Note. The task force does not announce L's death and agrees to have Light operate as the new L. With Light working as both L and Kira, the investigation stalls but crime rates continue to drop as he no longer has a threat of capture.

Four years later, cults that worship Kira have risen. Two young men, raised as potential successors to L, are revealed: Near and Mello. Mello joins the mafia whilst Near joins forces with the US government. Mello kidnaps Director Takimura, who Light then kills, so Mello, kidnaps Light's sister and exchanges her for the Death Note, using it to kill almost all of Near's team. A Shinigami named Sidoh goes to Earth to reclaim his notebook and ends up meeting and helping Mello. Light uses the notebook to find Mello's hideout, but Soichiro is killed in the mission. Mello and Near exchange information and Mello kidnaps Mogi and gives him to Near. Kira supporters attack Near's group, but they escape. Aizawa becomes suspicious in Light and meets with Near. As suspicion falls again on Misa, Light passes Misa's Death Note to a fervent supporter of Kira, Teru Mikami. He also appoints newscaster Kiyomi Takada as Kira's public spokesperson. Near has Mikami followed whilst Aizawa's suspicions are confirmed. Realizing that Takada is connected to Kira, Mello kidnaps her. Takada kills Mello but is killed by Light. Near arranges a meeting between Light and the current Kira Task Force members. Light tries to have Mikami kill Near as well as all the task force members, but Mikami's Death Note fails to work, having been replaced with a decoy. Perusing the names Mikami had written down, only Light's is missing, which proves Light is Kira. Light is grievously wounded in a scuffle and begs Ryuk to write the names of everyone present. Ryuk instead writes down Light's name in his Death Note, as he had promised to do the day they met, and Light dies.

One year later, the world has returned to normal and the Kira Taskforce Members are conflicted over whether they made the right decision. Meanwhile, cults worshipping Kira have risen, led by a woman resembling Misa. Three years later, Near, now functioning as the new L, receives word that a new Kira has appeared. Hearing that the new Kira is randomly killing people, Near concludes that the new Kira is an attention-seeker and denounces the new Kira as "boring" and not worth catching. A shinigami named Midora approaches Ryuk and gives him an apple from the human realm, in a bet to see if a random human could become the new Kira, but Midora loses the bet when the human writes his own name in the Death Note after hearing Near's announcement. Ryuk tells Midora that no human would ever surpass Light as the new Kira.

Production

Development
The Death Note concept derived from a rather general concept involving Shinigami and "specific rules". Author Tsugumi Ohba wanted to create a suspense series because the genre had few suspense series available to the public. After publication of the pilot chapter, the series was not expected to receive approval as a serialized comic. Learning that Death Note had in fact received approval and that Takeshi Obata would create the artwork, Ohba said, he "couldn't even believe it". Due to positive reactions, Death Note became a serialized manga series.

"Thumbnails" incorporating dialogue, panel layout and basic drawings were created, reviewed by an editor and sent to Takeshi Obata, the illustrator, with the script finalized and the panel layout "mostly done". Obata then determined the expressions and "camera angles" and created the final artwork. Ohba concentrated on the tempo and the amount of dialogue, making the text as concise as possible. Ohba commented that "reading too much exposition" would be tiring and would negatively affect the atmosphere and "air of suspense". The illustrator had significant artistic licence to interpret basic descriptions, such as "abandoned building", as well as the design of the Death Notes themselves.

When Ohba was deciding on the plot, he said, he visualized the panels while relaxing on his bed, drinking tea, or walking around his house. Often the original draft was too long and needed to be refined in order to finalize the desired "tempo" and "flow". The writer remarked on his preference for reading the previous "two or four" chapters carefully to ensure consistency in the story.

The typical weekly production schedule consisted of five days of creating and thinking and one day using a pencil to insert dialogue into rough drafts; after this point, the writer faxed any initial drafts to the editor. The illustrator's weekly production schedule involved one day with the thumbnails, layout, and pencils and one day with additional penciling and inking. Obata's assistants usually worked for four days and Obata spent one day to finish the artwork. Obata said that when he took a few extra days to color the pages, this "messed with the schedule". In contrast, the writer took three or four days to create a chapter on some occasions, while on others he took a month. Obata said that his schedule remained consistent except when he had to create color pages.

Ohba and Obata rarely met in person during the creation of the serialized manga; instead, the two met with the editor. The first time they met in person was at an editorial party in January 2004. Obata said that, despite the intrigue, he did not ask his editor about Ohba's plot developments as he anticipated the new thumbnails every week. The two did not discuss the final chapters with one another and continued talking only with the editor. Ohba said that when he asked the editor if Obata had "said anything" about the story and plot, the editor responded: "No, nothing".

Ohba claims that the series ended more or less in the manner that he intended for it to end; he considered the idea of L defeating Light Yagami with Light dying, but instead chose to use the "Yellow Box Warehouse" ending. According to Ohba, the details had been set "from the beginning". The writer wanted an ongoing plot line instead of an episodic series because Death Note was serialized and its focus was intended to be on a cast with a series of events triggered by the Death Note. 13: How to Read states that the humorous aspects of Death Note originated from Ohba's "enjoyment of humorous stories".

When Ohba was asked, during an interview, whether the series was meant to be about enjoying the plot twists and psychological warfare, Ohba responded by saying that this concept was the reason why he was "very happy" to place the story in Weekly Shōnen Jump.

Concepts

The notebooks
The core plot device of the story is the "Death Note" itself, a black notebook with instructions (known as "Rules of the Death Note") written on the inside. When used correctly, it allows anyone to commit a murder, knowing only the victim's name and face. According to the director of the live-action films, Shusuke Kaneko, "The idea of spirits living in words is an ancient Japanese concept.... In a way, it's a very Japanese story".

Artist Takeshi Obata originally thought of the books as "Something you would automatically think was a Death Note". Deciding that this design would be cumbersome, he instead opted for a more accessible college notebook. Death Notes were originally conceived as changing based on time and location, resembling scrolls in ancient Japan, or the Old Testament in medieval Europe. However, this idea was never used.

Themes
Writer Tsugumi Ohba had no particular themes in mind for Death Note. When pushed, he suggested: "Humans will all eventually die, so let's give it our all while we're alive". In a 2012 paper, author Jolyon Baraka Thomas characterised Death Note as a psychological thriller released in the wake of the 1995 Tokyo subway sarin attack, saying that it examines the human tendency to express itself through "horrific" cults.

Pilot chapter
The Death Note process began when Ohba brought thumbnails for two concept ideas to Shueisha; Ohba said that the Death Note pilot, one of the concepts, was "received well" by editors and attained positive reactions by readers. Ohba described keeping the story of the pilot to one chapter as "very difficult", declaring that it took over a month to begin writing the chapter. He added that the story had to revive the killed characters with the Death Eraser and that he "didn't really care" for that plot device.

Obata said that he wanted to draw the story after he heard of a "horror story featuring shinigami". According to Obata, when he first received the rough draft created by Ohba, he "didn't really get it" at first, and he wanted to work on the project due to the presence of shinigami and because the work "was dark". He also said he wondered about the progression of the plot as he read the thumbnails, and if Jump readers would enjoy reading the comic. Obata said that while there is little action and the main character "doesn't really drive the plot", he enjoyed the atmosphere of the story. He stated that he drew the pilot chapter so that it would appeal to himself.

Ohba brought the rough draft of the pilot chapter to the editorial department. Obata came into the picture at a later point to create the artwork. They did not meet in person while creating the pilot chapter. Ohba said that the editor told him he did not need to meet with Obata to discuss the pilot; Ohba said "I think it worked out all right".

Anime adaptation
Tetsurō Araki, the director, said that he wished to convey aspects that "made the series interesting" instead of simply "focusing on morals or the concept of justice". Toshiki Inoue, the series organizer, agreed with Araki and added that, in anime adaptations, there is a lot of importance in highlighting the aspects that are "interesting in the original". He concluded that Light's presence was "the most compelling" aspect; therefore the adaptation chronicles Light's "thoughts and actions as much as possible". Inoue noted that to best incorporate the manga's plot into the anime, he "tweak[ed] the chronology a bit" and incorporated flashbacks that appear after the openings of the episodes; he said this revealed the desired tensions. Araki said that, because in an anime the viewer cannot "turn back pages" in the manner that a manga reader can, the anime staff ensured that the show clarified details. Inoue added that the staff did not want to get involved with every single detail, so the staff selected elements to emphasize. Due to the complexity of the original manga, he described the process as "definitely delicate and a great challenge". Inoue admitted that he placed more instructions and notes in the script than usual. Araki added that because of the importance of otherwise trivial details, this commentary became crucial to the development of the series.

Araki said that when he discovered the Death Note anime project, he "literally begged" to join the production team; when he joined he insisted that Inoue should write the scripts. Inoue added that, because he enjoyed reading the manga, he wished to use his effort.

Media

Manga

Death Note, written by Tsugumi Ohba and illustrated by Takeshi Obata, was serialized in Shueisha's shōnen manga magazine Weekly Shōnen Jump from December 1, 2003, to May 15, 2006. The series' 108 chapters were collected into twelve tankōbon volumes by Shueisha, released from April 2, 2004, to July 4, 2006. A one-shot chapter, titled , was published in Weekly Shōnen Jump on February 9, 2008. Set two years after the manga's epilogue, it sees the introduction of a new Kira and the reactions of the main characters in response to the copycat's appearance. Several Death Note yonkoma (four-panel comics) appeared in Akamaru Jump. The yonkoma were written to be humorous. The Akamaru Jump issues that printed the comics include 2004 Spring, 2004 Summer, 2005 Winter, and 2005 Spring. In addition Weekly Shōnen Jump Gag Special 2005 included some Death Note yonkoma in a Jump Heroes Super 4-Panel Competition. Shueisha re-released the series in seven bunkoban volumes from March 18 to August 19, 2014. On October 4, 2016, all 12 original manga volumes and the February 2008 one-shot were released in a single All-in-One Edition, consisting of 2,400 pages in a single book.

In April 2005, Viz Media announced that they had licensed the series for English release in North America. The twelve volumes were released from October 10, 2005 to July 3, 2007. The manga was re-released in a six-volume omnibus edition, dubbed "Black Edition". The volumes were released from December 28, 2010 to November 1, 2011. The All-in-One Edition was released in English on September 6, 2017, resulting in the February 2008 one-shot being released in English for the first time.

In addition, a guidebook for the manga was also released on October 13, 2006. It was named Death Note 13: How to Read and contained data relating to the series, including character profiles of almost every character that is named, creator interviews, behind the scenes info for the series and the pilot chapter that preceded Death Note. It also reprinted all of the yonkoma serialized in Akamaru Jump and the Weekly Shōnen Jump Gag Special 2005. Its first edition could be purchased with a Death Note-themed diorama which includes five finger puppets inspired by Near's toys. The five finger puppets are Kira, L, Misa, Mello, and Near. In North America, 13: How to Read was released on February 19, 2008.

In the June 2019 issue of Shueisha's Jump Square it was announced that a new one-shot chapter of Death Note would be published. Part of the complete manuscript debuted at the "30th Work Anniversary Takeshi Obata Exhibition: Never Complete" event which ran in Tokyo from July 13 to August 12, 2019. Titled "Death Note: Special One-Shot", the entire 87-page chapter was published in the March issue of Jump Square on February 4, 2020 and on Viz's website. A collected volume titled , which includes the February 2008 one-shot chapter, the "Special One-Shot" (re-titled , the series' pilot chapter and the "L: The Wammy's House"/"L: One Day" one-shot chapters and more, was released on February 4, 2021.

Light novels
A light novel adaptation of the series has been written by Nisio Isin, called Death Note Another Note: The Los Angeles BB Murder Cases. The novel was released by Shueisha on August 1, 2006. It serves as a prequel to the manga series, with Mello narrating the story of L's first encounter with Naomi Misora during the Los Angeles "BB Serial Murder Case" mentioned in volume 2 of the manga. Beside Naomi's character, the novel focuses on how L works and one of the criminals L has to chase down. Insight was given into Watari's orphanage and how the whole system of geniuses such as L, Mello, Beyond Birthday, Matt and Near were put to work. Viz released the novel in English on February 19, 2008. The film L: Change the World was also adapted into a light novel with the same name on December 25, 2007, by "M", While the novel is similar to the film, there are many significant changes to the plot (for example, Near is not a Thai boy, but the same Near that appears in the manga). It also reveals more information about L and his past. Viz released it on October 20, 2009.

Anime

The Death Note anime, directed by Tetsurō Araki and animated by Madhouse, began airing on Nippon TV on October 4, 2006, and finished its run on June 27, 2007, totaling 37 episodes. The series aired on the network "every Tuesday at 0:56", which is effectively Wednesday. The series was co-produced by Madhouse, Nippon Television, Shueisha, D.N. Dream Partners and VAP. In North America, the series was licensed by Viz for residents in the United States to use "Download-to-Own" and "Download-to-Rent" services while it was still airing in Japan. This move was seen as "significant because it marked the first time a well known Japanese anime property was made legally available in the 
United States for domestic audiences to download while the title was still airing on Japanese television". The downloadable episodes contained the original Japanese audio track and English subtitles, and were made available through IGN's Windows-only Direct2Drive service. DVDs of the series have also been released, containing both an English dubbed audio track, produced by Ocean Productions, and the original Japanese audio track with optional English subtitles. Viz announced at Anime Expo 2007 that the first DVD was officially released on November 20, 2007, in both regular and special editions, and also confirmed at Comic-Con International 2007 that the first 15,000 copies of each DVD contains collectible figures.

Death Note was slated to make its North American television premiere in Canada, as part of YTV's Bionix programming block, on September 7, 2007. However, the show was removed from the schedule at the last minute and the Canadian premiere was pushed back to October 26, 2007, at 10:00 p.m. The series premiered in the U.S. on October 20, 2007, at 12:00 a.m. on Adult Swim and ran until January 10, 2010, when its contract expired. The last episode aired on YTV, July 4, 2008, and would later air on Adult Swim two days later. The show was removed from YTV's schedule on July 5, 2008, with its last airing being a rerun of the final episode at 1:30 a.m. ET. Soon after, Bionix became a 2-hour block on Saturday nights. The show also streamed online free on Adult Swim Video, with a new episode available every Saturday afternoon, on the day of its broadcast premiere. On July 26, 2017, Starz announced that they would be offering episodes of the series for their Video on Demand service starting August 1, 2017.

A two-hour animated  TV special aired on Nippon Television in Japan on August 31, 2007, at 8:00 p.m. It is a recap which takes place after the series end, where a shinigami approaches Ryuk in the shinigami realm in order to learn more about the human world. Instead, Ryuk tells him of all the events leading up to the last story arc, about Light Yagami and his rival L. Originally, this special was advertised as a retelling told from Ryuk's point of view, but it does not give a different point of view from what was originally told. However, it contains updated dialog, as well as a few new scenes.

The Japanese broadcaster NTV aired the  special on August 22, 2008. Like the first special, this new compilation summarized a part of the 2006–2007 anime television series. Specifically, it recounted the final half of the suspenseful supernatural story, including the investigators Near and Mello's confrontations with the vigilante Kira. This version features more updates than the previous one, most notably omission of the mafia plot.

Soundtracks

Several soundtracks for the series have been released. The music from the anime was composed by Yoshihisa Hirano and Hideki Taniuchi, while the CDs were also published by VAP. The first one was Death Note Original Soundtrack, which was released in Japan on December 21, 2006. It contains music from the series with the first opening and ending themes are sung by the Japanese band Nightmare in the TV size format. Death Note Original Soundtrack II was first released in Japan on March 21, 2007. It features the new opening and closing themes by Maximum the Hormone in the TV size format. The third CD, Death Note Original Soundtrack III was released on June 27, 2007. The tracks 1–21 were composed and arranged by Taniuchi, while the tracks 22–28 were composed and arranged by Hirano. The album features one track sung by Aya Hirano, who was also the Japanese voice actress of Misa Amane in the anime series. Also appearing on this soundtrack is the ending theme Coda〜Death Note, which can be heard at the end of the final episode of the anime as the credits are shown.

Several soundtracks have also been released for the live action films. Sound of Death Note is a soundtrack featuring music from the first Death Note film composed and arranged by Kenji Kawai. It was released on June 17, 2006, by VAP. Sound of Death Note the Last name is the soundtrack from the second Death Note film, Death Note the Last name. It was released on November 2, 2006. Death Note Tribute is a tribute album dedicated to the live action film Death Note. Published by BMG Japan on June 21, 2006, Japan, it contains 15 tracks performed by various artists, such as Shikao Suga, M-Flo, Buck-Tick, and Aya Matsuura. The soundtrack came with a cosplay Death Note notebook. Another tribute album is The Songs for Death Note the movie〜the Last name Tribute dedicated to the second film. Published by Sony Music Entertainment Japan on December 20, 2006, it contains 14 tracks performed by various artists, such as Orange Range, Abingdon Boys School, High and Mighty Color, Doping Panda, and Galneryus.

Live-action films

Death Note was adapted into a series of live-action films in 2006. The first two films were directed by Shusuke Kaneko and the third was directed by Hideo Nakata and produced by Nippon Television, CG production of all three films were done by Digital Frontier and distributed by Warner Bros. Pictures Japan. The first film, simply titled Death Note, premiered in Japan on June 17, 2006, and topped the Japanese box office for two weeks, pushing The Da Vinci Code into second place. The first film briefly played in certain North American theaters on May 20–21, 2008. The film was broadcast in Canadian theaters for one night only on September 15, 2008. The DVD was released on September 16, 2008, one day after the Canadian showing. The sequel, Death Note 2: The Last Name, premiered in Japan on November 3, 2006. It was featured in U.S. theaters in October 2008.

A spin-off from the films named L: Change the World was released in Japan on February 9, 2008. It is focused on the final 23 days of L's life, as he solves one final case involving a bio-terrorist group. Two dubbed versions of the film were shown in the United States on April 29 and 30, 2009. In August 2016, a three-part miniseries entitled Death Note: New Generation was announced as a part of the Death Note live-action film series and aired in September. It bridges the 10-year gap between the previous films and the then-upcoming 2016 film. A fourth Japanese Death Note film was released in 2016 and featured a cyber-terrorism setting with the inclusion of six Death Notes brought into the human world. An American adaptation was released on Netflix on August 25, 2017. The film was directed by Adam Wingard and was written by Charles Parlapanides, Vlas Parlapanides, and Jeremy Slater. It starred Nat Wolff, Lakeith Stanfield, Margaret Qualley, Shea Whigham, Paul Nakauchi, Jason Liles, and Willem Dafoe. It was rated by many negatively after its release, and ranked low on Rotten Tomatoes. A sequel film is reportedly in the works.

Live-action series

In April 2015, it was announced that a live-action television series based on Death Note manga would begin airing from July 2015 on NTV. Masataka Kubota stars as Light Yagami and Kento Yamazaki as L in the series.

In July 2022, it was announced that the Duffer Brothers are producing a new live-action series adaptation for Netflix. In October 2022, it was announced that Halia Abdel-Meguid would write and executive produce the series.

Video games
A Death Note video game developed and published by Konami for the Nintendo DS, titled , was released on February 15, 2007. Kira Game is a strategy game where the player takes on the role of Kira or L. These are just titles, as any character can be Kira or L. The player will attempt to deduce who their enemy is (Kira will try to uncover L's identity and vice versa). This will play out in three phases: investigation, where the player will discuss the case and clues with other characters; voting, where each member of the investigation team casts a vote on who they suspect is L or Kira based on the player's performance in the previous phase; L/Kira, where the player can either focus their investigation on one member to see if they are Kira (L part), or force a member off of the team (Kira part). A sequel to the game, was released in Japan on July 12, 2007. The storyline is based on the second part of the manga, featuring characters such as Mello and Near.

A third game, was released for the Nintendo DS in Japan on February 7, 2008. The player assumes the role of a rookie FBI agent who awakens in a strange hotel and attempts to escape with the help of L, who provides assistance via an in-game PDA. The story is set before the Kira investigation in the original series. Several characters from Death Note appear in Jump Super Stars and Jump Ultimate Stars, a fighting game featuring multiple characters from Weekly Shōnen Jump titles. Light, Ryuk, and L appear in Jump Super Stars as support characters. Misa, Near, and Mello are added as support characters in Jump Ultimate Stars as well. The 2019 video game Jump Force features Light and Ryuk as non-playable characters, playing a key role in the game's story mode.

Musical

In 2015, a musical adaptation of the manga called Death Note: The Musical ran in both Japan and South Korea. It was originally composed in English by Broadway composer Frank Wildhorn, with lyrics by Jack Murphy and book by Ivan Menchell, though no English-language production has been announced . The original Japanese production, produced by Japanese talent agency , ran from 6 to April 29, 2015, and stars Kenji Urai and  double-cast as Light Yagami, and Teppei Koike as L. A Korean production of the same musical ran from June 11 to August 11, 2015, in South Korea, starring musical actor Hong Kwang-ho and JYJ member and musical actor Kim Junsu.

Reception

Manga
As of April 2015, the Death Note manga had over 30 million copies in circulation. On ICv2's "Top 10 Shonen Properties Q2 2009", Death Note was the third best-selling manga property in North America. The series ranked second on Takarajimasha's Kono Manga ga Sugoi! list of best manga of 2006 and 2007 for male readers. It was nominated for the 38th Seiun Awards in the Best Comic category in 2007. The manga received the Grand Prize of Best Manga and Best Screenplay at the Japan Expo Awards 2007. The series won the 2008 Eagle Award for Favourite Manga as voted by UK fans. According to a survey conducted in 2007 by the Ministry of culture of Japan, occupies the 10th place among the best manga of all time. It also received several nominations such as Best Manga at the 2006 American Anime Awards, the 2007 Tezuka Osamu Cultural Prize, an Official Selection at Angoulême International Comics Festival 2008, and Obata was nominated for Best Penciller/Inker at the 2008 Eisner Awards. In 2007, the first three volumes of Death Note were on the American Library Association's 2007 Great Graphic Novels for Teens Top Ten list.

Douglas Wolk of Salon said that a rumor circulated stating that the creators intended to create Death Note to last half as long as its actual run and Ohba and Obata had been persuaded to lengthen the storyline when Death Notes popularity increased, noting that the rumor "makes sense, since about halfway through the series, there's a point that seems like a natural ending". In addition, he said that fans wrote "thousands" of Death Note fan fiction stories and posted them on the internet. In 2006, Japanese fans pointed out the similarities between Death Note and the 1973 one-shot manga  by Shigeru Mizuki. Comipress reported that the only difference between the story and Death Note is that there are no shinigamis.

Anime News Network writer Zac Bertschy called Death Note a "surprisingly gripping and original suspense tale that raises a handful of interesting questions about morality". He noted that the difference between the series and other manga from the same demographic was very big due to the murders the main character commits as well as how he hides his identity of Kira. Although Bertschy mentioned some manga readers will be surprised with the dark themes of Death Note, he praised the series for its "great art, great story, [and] compelling characters". Briana Lawrence from the same website stated that what makes Death Note so interesting is that there is no villain, "instead it had two opposing sides that both believe in the same thing: justice". She felt that once vital characters fading into the background, the ending brings back what the fans loved about the first volume and the supporting cast are "given a chance to shine". She also mentioned that the epilogue made no mention of what happens with Misa Amane and how Near and Mello were still treated like parts of L. Julie Rosato from Mania Entertainment found the story to be very entertaining, having liked Light's development in the story and L's introduction as well as how the latter starts suspecting the former's identity. Additionally, she praised the story as it is "building a climax" with each detail introduced in the first chapter, making the reader look forward to upcoming chapters. Jolyon Baraka Thomas, in a Japanese Journal of Religious Studies article, describes the manga as having a "somber narrative" with a "dark cast". Obata's art is "[rendered] in stark strokes characterized---fittingly---by a complex interplay of light and shadow".

Anime
On Rotten Tomatoes, the show holds an approval rating of 100%, based on 14 reviews, with an average rating of 8.5/10. The website's critical consensus reads: "Death Note is an exceptional anime that poses profound questions about justice and murder, all while delivering a supremely satisfying tale of tactical one-upmanship between a detective and killer." The Death Note anime was one of the series to win Best TV Anime at the 2007 Tokyo International Anime Fair. The anime was commended with Tom S. Pepirium of IGN saying that Death Notes "heavy serialized nature" is what "makes the show so engaging and discussion worthy". Pepirium, saying that translating Death Note is "no small task", stated that Stephen Hedley created an English dub with "nothing clunky". He added that Karl Willems, director of the dub, assembled a "stunning voice cast of professionals" with a "solid tone minus some of the cheesy yelling and screaming of other dubs". On the NPR show Fresh Air, John Powers said that Death Note is "at least as addictive as a show like Lost". It was also listed as the 51st best animated show in IGN's Top 100 Animated Series. Hyper wrote:  Jacob Hope Chapman from Anime News Network praised Teru Mikami's role as bloody and flashy as ever better than that of Near, Mello, and Misa.

Light novels
A.E. Sparrow of IGN reviewed the novel Another Note and gave it a 9.5 out of 10. Sparrow said that the author understood "what made these characters click so well" and "captures everything that made the manga the compelling read that it is". Sparrow said that fans of Death Note who read Another Note will "find a welcome home" in Nisio Isin's work which "adds a few more fun layers" to the Death Note franchise. The novelization of L: Change the World became the second top-selling light novel in Japan during 2008.

Legacy and controversies
The series release outside Japan was met with a wave of copycat crimes. According to Wired magazine, Death Note "[turned] Japan's most-popular print medium into an internationally controversial topic that has parents wondering whether they should prohibit their kids from reading manga entirely". Live-action director Shusuke Kaneko commented in response, "If preventing them from seeing this movie is going to make kids better, then why not prevent them from watching all bad news?".

In regards to the 2019 The Twilight Zone episode "The Comedian", Rosie Knight of The Hollywood Reporter stated that "Samir's story appears to take a large influence from ... Death Note." The Simpsons has parodied Death Note in both comic books and animation with the 2008 comic book story "Murder, He Wrote" in The Simpsons Treehouse of Horror #14, where Bart receives the notebook from the Ryuk-ified ghost of Krusty the Clown, and the "Death Tome" segment of the 2022 television episode "Treehouse of Horror XXXIII", with Lisa receiving the titular book.

Bans and attempted bans
Early in 2005, school officials in Shenyang, the capital of Liaoning (People's Republic of China), banned Death Note. The immediate cause was that students had been altering notebooks to resemble Death Notes and then writing the names of acquaintances, enemies, and teachers in the books. The ban was designed to protect the "physical and mental health" of students from horror material that "misleads innocent children and distorts their mind and spirit". Jonathan Clements has suggested that the Chinese authorities acted partly against "superstition", but also against illegal, pirate publishers of Death Note. The ban has been extended to other Chinese cities including Beijing, Shanghai and Lanzhou in Gansu Province. Legally published Chinese-language versions of Death Note are published in Hong Kong. On June 12, 2015, the Chinese Ministry of Culture listed Death Note among 38 anime and manga titles banned in China.

In 2007, the education bureau in Pingtung County, Taiwan asked teachers to pay attention to any negative influence on elementary school students reading the manga. In May 2010, the Albuquerque Public Schools in New Mexico held a hearing to ban the Death Note manga from their district's schools; it was unanimously voted down. After volumes of Death Note were found at the February 2013 suicide of a 15-year-old girl in Yekaterinburg, Russia, a local parents' group began campaigning to regulate all media based on the series, saying that it had an adverse effect on the minds of children. In March 2014, investigators concluded that the manga did not cause the girl to commit suicide.

Imitations of the series

There have been various imitations around the world of the premise of Death Note. At least one instance was linked to a crime - on September 28, 2007, two notes written with Latin characters stating  , were found near the partial remains of a Caucasian male in Belgium. The case has been called the "Mangamoord" (Dutch for Manga Murder) in Belgian media. It was not until 2010 that four people were arrested in connection to the murder. A senior at the Franklin Military Academy in Richmond, Virginia, United States was suspended in 2007 after being caught possessing a replica "Death Note" notebook with the names of fellow students. The school's principal wrote a letter to the student's parents linking to an unofficial website where visitors can write names and circumstances of death for people they want to die.

In South Carolina in March 2008, school officials seized a "Death Note" notebook from a Hartsville Middle School student. District officials linked the notebook to the anime/manga. The notebook listed seven students' names. The school planned a disciplinary hearing and contacted the seven students' parents. In Gadsden, Alabama in April 2008, two sixth-grade boys were arrested for possession of a "Death Note" that listed names of several staff members and fellow students. According to Etowah County Sheriff's Department Sgt. Lanny Handy, the notebook was discovered the previous afternoon by a staffer. The students were suspended from the county's schools, pending a juvenile court hearing. The students, their parents, and school officials had met with Handy and a junior probation officer. In Gig Harbor, Washington, one middle school student was expelled and three were suspended on May 14, 2008, for having 50 names in their own "Death Note" book, including President George W. Bush.

It was reported in September 2009, that a Year Eight boy in Sydney, Australia, created a "Death Note" that along with names contained a "battle plan" detailing where bombs could be placed inside his school. In December 2009, two students at an elementary school in Oklahoma were disciplined for a "Death Note" with the names and descriptions of deaths of two girls that had angered them. A Michigan middle school student was suspended indefinitely in March 2010 for a "Death Note". In May 2010, a middle school student in Avonworth School District in Pennsylvania was suspended for a "Death Note" with names of fellow students and pop singer Justin Bieber. In February 2015, a fifth-grade student of an elementary school near Pittsburgh was suspended for owning a "Death Note" and writing other students' names in it.

See also
 Now: Zero — A short story by J. G. Ballard with a similar premise to Death Note.

Notes

References

External links

  
 Viz Media's Death Note website
 Madman Entertainment's Death Note website
 

Death Note
2003 manga
2006 anime television series debuts
2007 Japanese novels
2007 anime films
2008 anime films
2020 manga
Anime and manga controversies
Censored television series
Comics about death
Crime in anime and manga
Fictional rivalries
Films directed by Tetsurō Araki
Films with screenplays by Toshiki Inoue
Madhouse (company)
Madman Entertainment anime
Madman Entertainment manga
Manga adapted into films
Mass murder in fiction
Mystery anime and manga
Nippon TV original programming
Occult detective anime and manga
Psychological thriller anime and manga
Shinigami in anime and manga
Shōnen manga
Shueisha manga
Supernatural thriller anime and manga
Television censorship in China
Television series about fictional serial killers
Viz Media anime
Viz Media manga
Works about fictional serial killers
Works banned in China
Works banned in Russia